The Heathkit H11 Computer is an early kit-format personal computer introduced in 1978. It is essentially a Digital Equipment PDP-11 in a small-form-factor case, designed by Heathkit. The H11 is one of the first 16-bit personal computers, at a list price of US$1,295, but it also requires at least a computer terminal and some form of storage to make it useful. It was too expensive for most Heathkit customers, and was discontinued in 1982.

Specifications
The H11 featured:
 Processor — LSI-11 (KD11-HA half-size or "double-height" card)
 Speed            — 2.5 MHz
 ROM              — 8Kwords (16 Kbytes) (max)
 RAM              — 32Kwords (64 Kbytes) (max)
 Slots            — 7 Q-bus slots
 Storage          — H27 8-inch floppy drive  (2 256k 8-inch single sided drives) or paper tape
 I/O              — serial (RS-232) or parallel ports
 Operating system — HT-11 (a simplified version of RT-11)
 Instruction set  — PDP-11/40 instruction set
 Languages        — BASIC, Focal and others

Initial memory limitations restrict the selection of system software, but the system can be expanded to 32KW x 16-bit RAM. Many PDP-11 operating systems and programs run without trouble. The system will also work with most DEC PDP-11 equipment, including many Q-bus compatible peripherals.

See also 
 Elektronika BK
 Heathkit H8

References

External links
 Heathkit H-11 Computer, Heathkit Computer Advertisements, Decode Systems
 Computer Museum illustration of fully expanded H11 with the Heath/Zenith label.

Early microcomputers
PDP-11
16-bit computers
Heathkit computers